Air Chief Marshal Sir Brian Kevin Burridge,  (born 26 September 1949) is a retired Royal Air Force officer. A former Nimrod pilot, Burridge was in overall command of British forces under Operation Telic during the 2003 invasion of Iraq.

RAF career
Brian Burridge joined the Royal Air Force as a university cadet (as a member of Cambridge University Air Squadron), being commissioned on 24 September 1967. He was a pilot with operational background in the maritime patrol role, serving on Nos 206 and 120 Squadrons.

Burridge was promoted to the rank of pilot officer on 15 July 1970, to flying officer on 15 January 1971, flight lieutenant on 13 April 1972 to squadron leader on 1 July 1979 and to wing commander on 1 July 1985. In 1986 he attended the Royal Naval Staff College and then later that year went on to command the Nimrod Operational Conversion Unit. Promoted to group captain in 1990, he became officer commanding RAF Kinloss.

From 1992 Burridge served in the Ministry of Defence, initially as Deputy Director of Force Doctrine (RAF) and later becoming the Director of Force Development in the Central Staff before being made Principal Staff Officer to the Chief of the Defence Staff in 1994 in the rank of air commodore. In 1997 he attended the Cabinet Office Top Management Programme and then later in the year became a Defence Fellow at King's College London. In 1998 he attended the Higher Command and Staff Course being promoted to air vice marshal on 1 July 1998. In January 2000 he became Commandant of the Joint Services Command and Staff College, subsequently moving the college into a Public Private Partnership at Shrivenham. On 12 February 2002, Burridge was promoted to air marshal and appointed Deputy Commander-in-Chief, Strike Command.

Burridge was in overall command of British forces under Operation Telic during the 2003 invasion of Iraq. In June 2003, Burridge appeared before the Commons Defence Select Committee, telling MPs of delays in distributing equipment to troops in Iraq and of his role in vetoing potentially controversial air strikes while he was in command in Iraq. He was appointed a Knight Commander of the Order of the Bath "for gallant and distinguished services whilst on operations in Iraq during the period 19 March to 19 April 2003" on 31 October 2003.

In July 2003 Burridge became Commander-in-Chief RAF Strike Command. He served as air aide-de-camp to Queen Elizabeth II from 31 July 2003 to 17 January 2006. He retired on 18 January 2006 with the rank of air chief marshal, though his commission in the reserve was extended to January 2015.

On 8 December 2009, Burridge gave evidence to The Iraq Inquiry.

On 1 October 2018, Burridge assumed operational command of the RAeS.

Interests
In 2005 Air Marshal Burridge was president of the RAF Mountaineering Association and a trustee of the Windsor Leadership Trust. Burridge sat as chair of the Bentley Priory Battle of Britain Trust and was present at the facility's closing ceremony in 2007. He attained a master's degree in business administration from the Open University.

References

External links
Official Biography Page

|-
 

|-

|-

Living people
Military personnel from Kent
Graduates of the Royal Naval College, Greenwich
Royal Air Force air marshals
Knights Commander of the Order of the Bath
Commanders of the Order of the British Empire
Alumni of the Open University
Fellows of the Royal Aeronautical Society
People from Maidstone
Royal Air Force personnel of the Iraq War
British military leaders of the Iraq War
1949 births